Neuroinformatics is a quarterly peer-reviewed scientific journal published by Springer Science+Business Media. It covers all aspects of neuroinformatics. The journal is abstracted and indexed in MEDLINE/PubMed, Scopus and the Science Citation Index Expanded. According to the Journal Citation Reports, the journal has a 2020 impact factor of 4.085. The founding co-editors-in-chief were Giorgio A. Ascoli, Erik De Schutter, and David N. Kennedy.  The current editor-in-chief is John Darrell Van Horn from the University of Virginia.

References

External links

Neuroinformatics
Neuroscience journals
Springer Science+Business Media academic journals
English-language journals
Publications established in 2003
Quarterly journals